Otter Creek Township is one of the twenty-one townships of Tama County, Iowa, United States.

History
Otter Creek Township was organized in 1856.

References

Townships in Tama County, Iowa
Townships in Iowa